NYSBA may refer to:
New York State Bar Association
New York State Bridge Authority